Mahendra Mohan Rai Choudhury is an Asom Gana Parishad politician from Assam. He was elected in Assam Legislative Assembly election in 1985, 1996 and 2011 from Kalaigaon constituency.

References 

Living people
Asom Gana Parishad politicians
People from Udalguri district
Assam MLAs 2011–2016
Assam MLAs 1996–2001
Assam MLAs 1985–1991
Year of birth missing (living people)